Smerinthini is a tribe of moths of the family Sphingidae. The genus was erected by Augustus Radcliffe Grote and Herbert C. Robinson in 1865.

Taxonomy 
Genus Acanthosphinx Aurivillius, 1891
Genus Afroclanis Carcasson, 1968
Genus Afrosataspes Basquin & Cadiou, 1986
Genus Afrosphinx Carcasson, 1968
Genus Agnosia Rothschild & Jordan, 1903
Genus Amorpha Hübner, 1809
Genus Anambulyx Rothschild & Jordan, 1903
Genus Andriasa Walker, 1856
Genus Avinoffia Clark, 1929
Genus Cadiouclanis Eitschberger, 2007
Genus Callambulyx Rothschild & Jordan, 1903
Genus Ceridia Rothschild & Jordan, 1903
Genus Chloroclanis Carcasson, 1968
Genus Clanidopsis Rothschild & Jordan, 1903
Genus Clanis Hübner, 1819
Genus Coequosa Walker, 1856
Genus Craspedortha Mell, 1922
Genus Cypa Walker, 1865
Genus Cypoides Matsumura, 1921
Genus Daphnusa Walker, 1856
Genus Dargeclanis Eitschberger, 2007
Genus Degmaptera Hampson, 1896
Genus Falcatula Carcasson, 1968
Genus Grillotius Rougeot, 1973
Genus Gynoeryx Carcasson, 1968
Genus Imber Moulds, Tuttle & Lane, 2010
Genus Langia Moore, 1872
Genus Laothoe Fabricius, 1807
Genus Larunda Kernbach, 1954
Genus Leptoclanis Rothschild & Jordan, 1903
Genus Leucophlebia Westwood, 1847
Genus Likoma Rothschild & Jordan, 1903
Genus Lophostethus Butler, 1876
Genus Lycosphingia Rothschild & Jordan, 1903
Genus Malgassoclanis Carcasson, 1968
Genus Marumba Moore, 1882
Genus Microclanis Carcasson, 1968
Genus Mimas Hübner, 1819
Genus Morwennius Cassidy, Allen & Harman, 2002
Genus Neoclanis Carcasson, 1968
Genus Neopolyptychus Carcasson, 1968
Genus Opistoclanis Jordan, 1929
Genus Oplerclanis Eitschberger, 2007
Genus Pachysphinx Rothschild & Jordan, 1903
Genus Paonias Hübner, 1819
Genus Parum Rothschild & Jordan, 1903
Genus Phyllosphingia Swinhoe, 1897
Genus Phylloxiphia Rothschild & Jordan, 1903
Genus Pierreclanis Eitschberger, 2007
Genus Platysphinx Rothschild & Jordan, 1903
Genus Poliodes Rothschild & Jordan, 1903
Genus Polyptychoides Carcasson, 1968
Genus Polyptychopsis Carcasson, 1968
Genus Polyptychus Hübner, 1819
Genus Pseudandriasa Carcasson, 1968
Genus Pseudoclanis Rothschild, 1894
Genus Pseudopolyptychus Carcasson, 1968
Genus Rhadinopasa Karsch, 1891
Genus Rhodambulyx Mell, 1939
Genus Rhodoprasina Rothschild & Jordan, 1903
Genus Rufoclanis Carcasson, 1968
Genus Sataspes Moore, 1858
Genus Smerinthulus Huwe, 1895
Genus Smerinthus Latreille, 1802
Genus Viriclanis Aarvik, 1999
Genus Xenosphingia Jordan, 1920

Gallery

References

 
Smerinthinae
Taxa named by Augustus Radcliffe Grote
Taxa named by Herbert C. Robinson